"One Angry Fuchsbau" is the 17th episode and of the supernatural drama television series Grimm of season 2 and the 39th overall, which premiered on April 5, 2013, on NBC. The episode was written by Richard Hatem, and was directed by Terrence O'Hara.

Plot
Opening quote: "He sang a sweet song in tones so full and soft that no human ear could resist them nor fathom their origin..." (Source: The quotation is inspired by, but not actually from "The Garden of Paradise".))

In a flashback 6 months ago, a Löwen named Don Nidaria (Phillip Keiman) kills his Maushertz wife, Katherine (Erica Sullivan) in an attack of rage. In the present, Don's lawyer, Barry Kellogg (Brian T. Finney) uses his powers to spread a dust into the jury, which includes Rosalee as the foreman (Bree Turner) and causes them to agree with his statements.

Nick (David Giuntoli) gives Monroe (Silas Weir Mitchell) his permission to show Juliette (Bitsie Tulloch) the trailer. In the trailer, Juliette is confused by the books and weapons found. Suddenly, she begins seeing Nick's flashes to when he was trying to show her the Grimm world. Monroe finds Rosalee sick for the events in the court and decides to find out what's happening. He attends the trial and witnesses a witness change her testimony. He then follows Kellogg to the bathroom and watches him eat a toad and discovers he is a Ziegevolk.

Nick, Hank (Russell Hornsby), and Monroe attend the next hearing. They see Wu (Reggie Lee) change his testimony after persuasion from Kellogg. In the spice shop, Rosalee seems to have found a cure but the antidote requires Kellogg's sweat. Along with Bud (Danny Bruno), Nick, Hank and Monroe make a facade to get his sweat by having Monroe chase after Kellogg, who is "saved" by Bud and then given a handkerchief to get his sweat and finding where he is staying. The next day, Nick and Hank distract Kellogg while Monroe sneaks into his hotel room to inject his toad the antidote. However, he finds two toads and is forced to choose which one of them to inject.

Meanwhile, in Vienna, Adalind (Claire Coffee) meets with Eric (James Frain) to discuss Renard's (Sasha Roiz) failure to get the key, prompting Eric to decide to visit his brother. In the court, the jury finds Don guilty, shocking Kellogg. That night, while celebrating their victory, Monroe is visited by Kellogg in the spice shop, looking for an antidote for his condition. When he finds everyone in the shop, he woges into his Ziegevolk form and attacks them but is beaten by Monroe and arrested by Nick. The episode ends as Juliette receives the visions of Nick throughout time until she can barely sleep.

Reception

Viewers
The episode was viewed by 5.13 million people, earning a 1.5/5 in the 18-49 rating demographics on the Nielson ratings scale, ranking second on its timeslot and fifth for the night in the 18-49 demographics, behind Blue Bloods, Undercover Boss, 20/20, and Shark Tank. This was a 5% increase in viewership from the previous episode, which was watched by 4.86 million viewers with a 1.4/4. This means that 1.5 percent of all households with televisions watched the episode, while 5 percent of all households watching television at that time watched it. With DVR factoring in, the episode was watched by 7.91 million viewers with a 2.7 ratings share in the 18-49 demographics.

Critical reviews
"One Angry Fuchsbau" received positive reviews. The A.V. Club's Les Chappell gave the episode a "B+" grade and wrote, "'One Angry Fuchsbau' doesn't quite recapture the same energy that 'Season of the Hexenbiest' promised, but it's a definite step up over the last few weeks for many reasons. There are a lot of things happening in this episode — almost too many to make it feel structurally sound — and the majority of what's happening are events that need to happen if we want to move onto something stronger. And more importantly, after three bleak and violent episodes that fixated on serial killer Wesen, this is probably the most fun an episode of Grimms ever been, one that takes the show's stronger elements and sets them loose in a good old fashioned caper."

Nick McHatton from TV Fanatic, gave a 3.9 star rating out of 5, stating: "'One Angry Fuchsbau' was a rather modest episode for Grimm Season 2. The callbacks, small moments and humor made for a fun, but mostly lighthearted installment. But that's about it."

Shilo Adams from TV Overmind, wrote: "Although I've not been a fan of the Juliette storyline this season, I liked how the case this week tied into the concept of memory and how easily it can be manipulated."

References

External links
 

Grimm (season 2) episodes
2013 American television episodes